Below are the rosters for the 1995 King Fahd Cup tournament in Saudi Arabia.

Group A

Denmark
Head coach: Richard Møller Nielsen

Mexico
Head coach: Miguel Mejía Barón

Saudi Arabia
Head coach: Mohammed Al-Kharashy

Group B

Argentina
Head coach: Daniel Passarella

Japan
Head coach: Shu Kamo

Nigeria
Head coach: Shuaibu Amodu

Sources
 Slutrundetrupper 1908-2004  at Danish Football Association

References

FIFA Confederations Cup squads
Squads